Stover–Winger Farm, also known as Tayamentasachta, is a historic farm complex located at Antrim Township in Franklin County, Pennsylvania. The house was built in the 1840s or 1850s, and is a two-story, four-bay, "T"-shaped, brick dwelling.  It has a two-story, three-bay brick cased log wing. It has a one-story, shed-roofed porch along three sides. Also on the property are a contributing brick beehive oven, brick end bank barn built in 1849 and rebuilt in 1876 after a fire, frame wagon shed, and metal "Stover Wind Engine". The farm was purchased by the Greencastle-Antrim School District in 1966.  The property includes the spring named Tayamentasachta, a favorite camp site for the Delaware Indians.

It was listed on the National Register of Historic Places in 1979.

References 

Farms on the National Register of Historic Places in Pennsylvania
Infrastructure completed in 1876
Houses in Franklin County, Pennsylvania
National Register of Historic Places in Franklin County, Pennsylvania